The 8th Television State Awards festival (Sinhala: 8 වැනි රූපවාහිනී රාජ්‍ය සම්මාන උලෙළ), was held to honor the television programs of 2011 and 2012 Sinhala television on January 29, 2013, at the Bandaranaike Memorial International Conference Hall, Colombo 07, Sri Lanka. The event was organized by the Department of Cultural Affairs under the guidance of the Ministry of Culture & the Arts. The First lady Shiranthi Rajapaksa was the chief guest.

At the award ceremony, veteran artists Arun Dias Bandaranaike, Piyadasa Ratnasingha and Rukman Tissa Wijemanna were received the Lifetime Achievement Awards. Meanwhile, Volume six of Rupavahini Samiksha was also launched at the event. It was presented to first Lady Shiranthi Rajapaksa by Culture and the Arts Minister T. B. Ekanayake.

2011 Awards

Media Section

Television Serial Section

Tamil Awards Section

2012 Awards

Media Section

Television Serial Section

Tamil Awards Section

See also
 14th Sri Lankan Television State Awards

References

Sri Lankan Television State Awards
Sri Lankan Television State Awards